Joshua Ozukum (born 4 August 2000) is an Indian cricketer. He made his Twenty20 debut on 13 January 2021, for Nagaland in the 2020–21 Syed Mushtaq Ali Trophy. He made his List A debut on 21 February 2021, for Nagaland in the 2020–21 Vijay Hazare Trophy.

References

External links
 

2000 births
Living people
Indian cricketers
Nagaland cricketers
Place of birth missing (living people)